"I Cried a Tear" is a song written by Fred Jay and Al Julia and performed by American singer LaVern Baker. Atlantic Records released it as a single in 1958, which became Baker's most successful appearance on the record chart hits. King Curtis played the saxophone.

It peaked at number two on the Billboard R&B chart in 1959 and also peaked at number six on the pop chart.

In 1959, Ernest Tubb recorded the song. His version peaked at number twelve on the Hot C&W Sides chart.

References

1958 songs
1958 singles
LaVern Baker songs
Atlantic Records singles